Les Ferres is a commune in the Alpes-Maritimes department in southeastern France.

Population

See also
Communes of the Alpes-Maritimes department

References

Communes of Alpes-Maritimes
Alpes-Maritimes communes articles needing translation from French Wikipedia